The 1927 WAFL season was the 43rd season of the West Australian Football League. It saw the last premiership of the East Perth dynasty dating back to the end of World War I, as mastermind coach Phil Matson was to be killed in a truck crash the following year and the Royals were to fall to a clear last in 1929 as most of their champions retired. Despite opening their permanent home ground at Claremont Oval, newcomers Claremont-Cottesloe showed little improvement on their debut season and again won only a single game. The most notable change in fortunes was from South Fremantle, who had their first season with more wins than losses since their last premiership in 1917, and extended Matson's Royals in the grand final.

VFL champions  became the second Victoria club to tour Perth after Fitzroy in 1922, and although an interstate carnival meant they were without several top players, the Magpies performed well enough to win one of their two matches against a representative team from those WAFL players not at the carnival.

Home-and-away season

Round 1

Round 2

Round 3

Round 4

Round 5 (Labour Day)

Round 6

Round 7

Round 8

Round 9 (Foundation Day)

Round 10

Round 11

Round 12

Round 13

Round 14

Round 15

Round 16

Round 17

Round 18

Collingwood Tour

First State Match

Second State Match

Round 19

Round 20

Round 21

Ladder

Finals

First semi-final

Second semi-final

Final

Grand Final

References

External links
Official WAFL website 
West Australian Football League (WAFL) Season 1927

West Australian Football League seasons
WAFL